Batt may refer to:

People
 Andrey Batt (born 1985), Russian rapper, actor, producer
 Batt (surname)
 Batt O'Keeffe (born 1945), Irish politician
 Pseudonym used by the English artist and illustrator, Oswald Barrett (1892–1945)

Industry
 Batt (building insulation), a form of thermal building insulation material
 Batting (material), pieces of fabric or fibre used for stuffing

Other uses
 BATT (professional wrestling) (Bad Ass Translate Trading), a professional wrestling stable
 Batt Reef, a coral reef off Port Douglas, Queensland, Australia
 Harry Batt, an English television programme
 The Batt, the student newspaper of Texas A&M University

See also 
 Bat (disambiguation)
 Batts